Austroeme is a genus of beetles in the family Cerambycidae, containing the following species:

 Austroeme femorata Martins, 1997
 Austroeme gentilis (Gounelle, 1909)
 Austroeme modesta (Gounelle, 1909)

References

Xystrocerini